The 2015 Tre Valli Varesine was the 95th edition of the Tre Valli Varesine single-day cycling race. As was the 2014 edition, it was raced in September; however, unlike the previous edition, it was held after the World Championships. It was the final part of the Trittico Lombardo. The race started in Busto Arsizio and concluded in Varese, after . The race consisted of the first 83 km from Busto Arsizio to Varese passing through several municipality of the Provincia di Varese, and then a final circuit in Varese that was repeated nine times  The race was won by Vincenzo Nibali, who attacked on the final climb and finished eight seconds ahead of the lead group. Sergey Firsanov was second, with Giacomo Nizzolo third.

Teams
The provisional start list include 19 teams:

Results

References

2015 UCI Europe Tour
2015 in Italian sport
Tre Valli Varesine